Jānis Tilbergs, also known as Tillbergs or Tilberg; ( – 7 November 1972) was a Latvian artist, painter, sculptor, and medallist. He is most renowned as a highly accomplished portraitist.

Career 
From 1901 to 1909 Tilbergs studied under Dmitry Kardovsky in the Imperial Academy of Arts in Saint Petersburg, then the capital of the Russian Empire.

Tilbergs graduated the Riga School of Art studying with Dimitriyev Kaukazska, then went on to complete his Master's degree at the St. Petersburg Art Academy in 1909, studying there with D. Kardovska, submitting as his masterwork "Pietà".

His artwork appeared in publication already in 1904 in the journal Austrums where he illustrated A. Niedra's story Bads un Mīlestība (Hunger and Love), and he went on to illustrate a number of other books. He was the graphic designer for the satirical journal Svari, published in St. Petersburg and Riga; as well, he illustrated for the Russian journals Serij Volk and Novaja Rusj.

Tilbergs helped organize and exhibited at the first Latvian art exhibition of 1910. Over his career, he exhibited at various international venues (Denmark, Sweden, Norway, France, England, et al.) as an ambassador of Latvian art and in one man shows in Riga (1934, 1960) and Tallinn (1961).

Following the 1917 Russian Revolution Tilbergs took part in Lenin's monumental propaganda program that called for the creation of the "Revolutionary monumental art", construction of the monuments to the revolutionaries and the "progressive artists of all times and nations". Tilbergs' plaster monument to Taras Shevchenko (pictured), the greatest Ukrainian poet, artist and humanist, was dedicated on 1 December 1918. This first ever Shevchenko monument was not later replaced by the bronze version, as was originally planned, and was dismantled in eight years as the plaster deteriorated in open air.

Tilbergs became a professor in the Latvian Academy of Arts in Riga where he taught a Figural Painting Master class in 1921–1932. He authored several designs of the coins minted in the interwar Latvia. The Latvian lats coins struck in 1924–1926 carried the palm branch design by Tilbergs, a motive popular in Europe at the time. In academia Tilbergs was considered a master of the salon portrait and his portraits of Rainis (Janis Plieksans), a great Latvian writer, and Eduards Smiļģis, a famous Latvian theatrical producer, are exhibited in the Latvian National Museum of Art. In Academy Tilbergs insisted on his students staying strictly within the academic canons of realism and was even considered despotic while his school was criticized for being too academic and lacking improvisation. In 1932 Tilbergs' class in Academia was taken over by Gederts Eliass.

In 1936 he painted a new altar for the historic Sigulda church.

Tilbergs return to the Academia in the post-World War II Soviet Latvia and remained a professor there from 1947 to 1957.

Recognition 
Tilbergs was widely renowned in Soviet Latvia where he was accorded the title of the People's Artist of the Latvian SSR and decorated with the Soviet Order of the Red Banner of Labour.

In modern Latvia he is recognised as one of the greatest national masters of the century. In 2005 the Latvian Post issued an item of postal stationery dedicated to Tilbergs' 125th birthday.

References

Sources
 Тилберг Янис in the Great Soviet Encyclopedia 

1880 births
1972 deaths
Artists from Riga
People from Kreis Riga
Latvian sculptors
Soviet painters
Soviet sculptors
20th-century sculptors
20th-century Latvian painters
20th-century Latvian artists
Russian military personnel of World War I
People's Artists of the Latvian Soviet Socialist Republic (visual arts)
Recipients of the Order of the Three Stars
Recipients of the Order of the Red Banner of Labour